Llama Llama may refer to:
 Llama llama, a dance of the Andes region
 Llama Llama (book series), a series of children's books
 Llama Llama (TV series), a Netflix TV series

See also 
 Lama Lama (disambiguation)